Víðblindi or Viðblindi ("Very blind") is a giant in Norse mythology.

The skald Hallar-Steinn uses the kenning "Viðblindi's boar" for whale in a stanza quoted by Snorri Sturluson in his Skáldskaparmál. Snorri explains it as follows:

Here the whale is called Boar of Viðblindi; this Viðblindi was a giant who drew whales out of the sea like fishes.

—Skáldskaparmál (XLVI), Brodeur's translation

A similar kenning for whale, "Víðblindi's pig", can be found in an  anonymous stanza from the 13th century preserved in Laufás-Edda.

Rudolf Simek noted that the only giant known for fishing whales is Hymir, but he is never called Víðblindi / Viðblindi.

Víðblindi is also listed among the giants in the þulur.

Notes

References
 Brodeur, Arthur Gilchrist (trans.). 1916. Snorri Sturluson: The Prose Edda. New York: The American-Scandinavian Foundation.
 Simek, Rudolf. 1996. Dictionary of Northern Mythology. Translated by Angela Hall. First published: Alfred Kröner Verlag, 1984. Cambridge: D. S. Brewer. .

Jötnar